Gently is the tenth studio album by American actress and singer Liza Minnelli. It was released on March 19, 1996. The album was nominated for the Grammy Award for Best Traditional Pop Vocal Album in 1997.

Track listing

Personnel 
Liza Minnelli – vocals
Chuck Berghofer – bass guitar
Terry Gibbs – vibraphone
Albie Berk – drums
John Tropea – electric guitar
Chuck Findley – trumpet
Tim May – guitar
Paulinho da Costa – percussion, congas
John Guerin – drums
Bob Magnusson – bass guitar
Mike Renzi – piano
Emil Richards – vibraphone
Jack Cavari – acoustic guitar
Gary Foster – saxophone
Neil Stubenhaus – bass guitar
Robbie Buchanan – keyboards
Randy Brecker – trumpet
Jim Hughart – bass guitar
Billy Stritch – piano, backing vocals
Grant Geissman – guitar
Lenny Castro – percussion, congas, timpani
Roger Kellaway – piano
Will Lee – bass guitar
John Robinson – drums
Nino Tempo – saxophone
Michael Landau – guitar
Pete Jolly – piano
Melissa Manchester – backing vocals
Brenda Russell – backing vocals

Charts

References

Liza Minnelli albums
1996 albums
Angel Records albums
Albums produced by Brooks Arthur